Hönig or Hoenig is a German surname. Notable people with the surname include:

Ari Hoenig (born 1973), jazz drummer, composer, and educator
Eugen Honig (1873–1945)
Franz-Josef Hönig (born 1942), German footballer
Heinz Hoenig, German actor
Jonathan Hoenig (born 1975), managing member at Capitalist Pig hedge fund
Luis Fernando González Hoenig (born 1995), Mexican baseball outfielder for the San Francisco Giants
Michael Hoenig (born 1952), German composer
Ron Hoenig, Australian Barrister, politician
Sebastian F. Hönig, DFG fellow in the astrophysics group of the University of California
Thomas M. Hoenig (born 1946), eighth chief executive of the Tenth District Federal Reserve Bank, in Kansas City, United States.
Wolfgang Hönig (born 1954), German rower

See also
51983 Hönig, a main belt asteroid
Hoenig v Isaacs

German-language surnames

(VANESSA ROSSE MARIE ACOSTA HÖNIG)
    {18/NOV/2000}